The Central District of Miandorud County is a district (bakhsh) in Miandorud County, Mazandaran Province, Iran.  At the 2006 census, its population was 39,605, in 10,342 families.  The District has one city: Surak. The District has three rural districts (dehestan): Kuhdasht-e Gharbi Rural District, Kuhdasht-e Sharqi Rural District, and Miandorud-e Bozorg Rural District.

References 

Miandorud County
Districts of Mazandaran Province